"Teenage Dirtbag" is a song by American rock band Wheatus. It was released on June 20, 2000, as the lead single from their eponymous debut album (2000). The song was written by guitarist and vocalist Brendan B. Brown and was inspired by a childhood experience of his.

The song was successful in Australia, spending four weeks at number one, being certified 3× Platinum, and becoming the second-best-selling single of 2000. It also reached number one in Austria and Flanders while peaking at number two in Ireland, Germany, and the United Kingdom, where it was certified 2× Platinum in 2018. It has sold 5 million copies worldwide as of 2014.

Background
"Teenage Dirtbag" is about a childhood experience that guitarist and vocalist Brendan B. Brown had. In a 2012 interview with Tone Deaf, he said:

Brown also added that the song's sing-along chorus remains an act of defiance: "so when I sing: 'I'm just a teenage dirtbag', I'm effectively saying: 'Yeah, fuck you if you don't like it. Just because I like AC/DC doesn't mean I'm a devil worshipper, and you're an idiot.' That's where it comes from." In the same interview, regarding the possible reasons for its continued success, Brown recalled his father's words: "Every teenager has to go through that 'being an outsider' thing, at least a little bit. So that story is still the same for people, even if it's thirty years after I went through it."

The song's vocals are all performed by Brown, including a segment in falsetto. When the group arranged a joint tour with MC Frontalot, MC Frontalot contributed a nerdcore rap verse to the song, as did MC Lars.

Critical reception
Ayhan Sahin of Billboard magazine reviewed the song favorably, calling it a "gritty, on-the-edge track" and saying that its "keen melody, inventive production, and cool lyric about those who have felt like underlings during high school will entice listeners who prefer hanging out behind the gym with a smoke to Latin club." He went on to say that it "stands strongly on its own as an emphatic anthem and a song many teens will be proud to push hard from their car speakers." In June 2013, Australian radio station Triple J ranked "Teenage Dirtbag" as number 82 on their "Twenty Years of Triple J's Hottest 100". The song was ranked number 69 on the "Top 100 Greatest Pop Songs of All Time" countdown by British music channel The Hits.

Commercial performance
In the United Kingdom, the song peaked at number two, staying there for two weeks and kept off the top spot by Atomic Kitten's "Whole Again". It spent four weeks at number one in Australia and also topped the charts in Austria and Flanders. Despite being a huge success in the UK, Europe and Australia, it failed to chart on the US Billboard Hot 100, peaking only at number seven on the Alternative Songs chart. In March 2011, the song returned to the UK Singles Chart at number 43 and climbed to number 35 the following week, nearly 11 years after its initial release. Bigtop40.com suggested that this was due to a promotion on iTunes. In April 2012, it re-entered the UK Singles Chart again, this time peaking at number 36; and then once again in March 2013, where it entered at number 46. The track has sold five million copies worldwide as of 2014.

Censorship
The second verse of the song originally began with, "Her boyfriend's a dick/He brings a gun to school". Radio edits usually omitted the word "dick" or edit it so that it sounds like the less offensive "prick", but most modern versions of the song have the words "gun to school" covered by scratching sounds. Some versions also edit the lines "And he'd simply kick/My ass if he knew the truth", to remove the word "ass". When asked why "gun" is frequently censored, Brown stated that it is because the day he presented the song to the band's record label was around the time of the first anniversary of the Columbine High School massacre. The song was re-recorded and re-released in 2020, retaining the original lines.

Music video
The music video for "Teenage Dirtbag", directed by Jeff Gordon, is based on the 2000 film Loser, which the song features in, and tells a different story from the film based on the song's lyrics. Jason Biggs plays a nerdy character and Mena Suvari is the love interest who unexpectedly invites the protagonist to an Iron Maiden concert, and in the end scene they dance together on prom night.

In some cases, the beginning and the end of the video were deleted: The full version of the video begins with Jason falling asleep while doing his homework and ends with a large glitter ball falling from the ceiling and striking him on the head. He then wakes up, revealing his brief romance with Suvari to have been all a dream. The video was nominated for Best Video at the Kerrang! Awards.

Rerecording
As the multitrack masters to "Teenage Dirtbag" were lost, Wheatus rerecorded it in 2016. Brown said they felt "compelled to recreate them so that, if for no other reason, we could own a copy". Wheatus took lengths to rerecord every element, including the distorted snare drum caused by a recording error in the original. Brown estimated that it took two years to recreate the song.

Track listings

Australian CD single
 "Teenage Dirtbag" – 4:01
 "I'd Never Write a Song About You" – 3:38
 "Pretty Girl" – 4:29

UK CD single
 "Teenage Dirtbag" (explicit album version) – 4:01
 "I'd Never Write a Song About You" – 3:38
 "Hey Mr Brown" (with club audience) –	2:22
 "Teenage Dirtbag" (CD extra video) – 3:57

UK cassette single
 "Teenage Dirtbag" (explicit album version) – 4:01
 "I'd Never Write a Song About You" – 3:38
 "Hey Mr Brown" (with club audience) –	2:22

European CD single
 "Teenage Dirtbag" (explicit album version) – 4:01
 "I'd Never Write a Song About You" – 3:38

European maxi-CD single
 "Teenage Dirtbag" (explicit album version) – 4:01
 "I'd Never Write a Song About You" – 3:38
 "Sunshine" (remix) – 2:52

Charts

Weekly charts

Year-end charts

Decade-end charts

Certifications

Release history

References

2000 debut singles
2000 songs
Columbia Records singles
Number-one singles in Australia
Number-one singles in Austria
Songs about proms
Ultratop 50 Singles (Flanders) number-one singles
Songs about teenagers
American pop punk songs
American pop rock songs
Alternative pop songs